Anne Currier (born 1950) is an American ceramist. She was born in Louisville, Kentucky, but she now resides in Scio, NY. Currier is known for her abstract ceramic works, which play with positive and negative space. Many of her works resemble the human form and architectural elements. In an artist statement, Currier revealed that her work was inspired by Greek and Buddhist sculpture. Currier also expressed that the play with visual planes, as found in the Cubist movement, was an inspiration.  

Currier earned a BFA from the School of the Art Institute of Chicago (1972) and a MFA from the University of Washington (1974). She has taught ceramics at both the University of Colorado (1975-1984) and Alfred University (1984-2016). Upon her retirement from Alfred University in 2016, Currier received the title of professor emerita. Her work has gained international attention, and it is included in the collections of the Museum of Fine Arts Houston, the Smithsonian American Art Museum, and the Memorial Art Gallery.

References

Living people
1950 births
20th-century American ceramists
21st-century American ceramists